Oakley is an unincorporated community in St. Mary's County, Maryland, United States. The River View (a historic home located in Oakley) was listed on the National Register of Historic Places in 1976.

References

Unincorporated communities in St. Mary's County, Maryland
Unincorporated communities in Maryland